John Victor Fernandes (born November 16, 1952) is an American state legislator who served in the Massachusetts House of Representatives. He is a Milford resident and a member of the Democratic Party.

References

Living people
Democratic Party members of the Massachusetts House of Representatives
People from Milford, Massachusetts
21st-century American politicians
1952 births